Yang Dingxin (born 19 October 1998) is a Chinese professional Go player.

Biography

Yang Dingxin was born in 1998 in Zhengzhou, Henan. As a young child, he lived in Bingcha in Rudong County, Nantong, Jiangsu and in Zhengzhou, and moved to Beijing when he was 6. His father, an amateur Go player, introduced him to Go when he was 5 years old. He earned professional status through the qualification tournament in 2008, when he was 9 years and 9 months old, breaking the record for the youngest professional Go player.

He won the 12th Ricoh Cup in 2012 at the age of 13 years and 6 months, which broke the record for the youngest player to win a Chinese professional tournament. He also won the Weifu Fangkai Cup in 2013, and the Changqi Cup in 2014.

He was the winner of the South-West Qiwang in 2016 and again in 2017.

In 2019, he won the 23rd LG Cup, his first international championship, defeating Shi Yue 2–1 in the finals. He was promoted to 9 dan for the victory.

He won seven consecutive games for China in the 21st Nongshim Cup (2019–2020). He was finally eliminated in his eighth game by Japan's Iyama Yuta. China went on to win the tournament.

He won the Tianyuan in 2020. In 2021, he was the South-West Qiwang winner for the third time.

Promotion record

Career record
2010: 28 wins, 11 losses

Titles and runners-up

References

1998 births
Living people
Chinese Go players